The 2017 Women's Indoor African Cup of Nation was held in Swakopmund, Namibia. It was originally scheduled from 23 to 25 June 2017.

The competition featured three teams, with the winner securing a place in the 2018 Women's Indoor Hockey World Cup.  The defending champions Namibia won the title by defeating the hosts South Africa 3(2)–3(1) in the final.

Results

Standings

Fixtures
All times are local (UTC+2).

Final

Statistics

Final standings

Awards
The following awards were given at the conclusion of the tournament.

Goalscorers

See also
2017 Men's African Hockey Indoor Cup of Nations

References

Indoor African Cup
indoor hockey
International sports competitions hosted by Namibia
Swakopmund
Indoor African Cup
Africa Cup